The 2005 UNAF U-20 Tournament was the 1st edition of the UNAF U-20 Tournament. The tournament took place in Tunisia, from 16 to 22 December 2005. Tunisia wins this first tournament.

Participants

 (hosts)

Tournament

Matches

Champion

References

2005 in African football
UNAF U-20 Tournament
UNAF U-20 Tournament